Diego Martín Rodríguez Telechea (born January 8, 1991) is a Uruguayan footballer who most recently played for Liverpool Montevideo as a defender. He is the older brother of professional striker Leandro Rodríguez.

Career
A product of local Montevideo Wanderers, Diego made his first team debut on April 18, 2010 against Tacuarembó, playing the last fifteen minutes as a substitute for Matías Quagliotti in 2−1 home win. During the summer of 2011, Diego signed for ambitious Málaga CF in Spanish La Liga and was registered for its B-side. In his two seasons with Atlético Malagueño he was a regular starter for the club appearing in 42 matches and scoring 5 goals.

In January 2014, he returned to his country to play for Juventud de Las Piedras. On January 14, 2015 he was transferred on a one-year loan to Vancouver Whitecaps FC. In December 2015, Vancouver announced that Rodriguez had returned to Juventud.

External links

Málaga CF profile

References

1991 births
Living people
Footballers from Montevideo
Uruguayan footballers
Association football defenders
Atlético Malagueño players
Málaga CF players
Montevideo Wanderers F.C. players
Juventud de Las Piedras players
Vancouver Whitecaps FC players
Whitecaps FC 2 players
Major League Soccer players
USL Championship players
Uruguayan expatriate footballers
Uruguayan expatriate sportspeople in Spain
Uruguayan expatriate sportspeople in Canada
Expatriate footballers in Spain
Expatriate soccer players in Canada